Containerization is operating system-level virtualization or application-level virtualization over multiple network resources so that software applications can run in isolated user spaces called containers in any cloud or non-cloud environment, regardless of type or vendor.

Usage 
The containers are basically a fully functional and portable cloud or non-cloud computing environment surrounding the application and keeping it independent from other parallelly running environments. Individually each container simulates a different software application and runs isolated processes by bundling related configuration files, libraries and dependencies. But, collectively multiple containers share a common OS Kernel.

In recent times, the containerization technology has vastly adopted by cloud computing platforms like Amazon Web Services, Microsoft Azure,  Google Cloud Platform, and IBM Cloud. Containerization has also been pursued by the U.S. Department of Defense as a way of more rapidly developing and fielding software updates, with first application in its F-22 air superiority fighter.

Types of containers 

 OS containers
 Apps containers

Security issues 
Because of common OS, security threats can affect the whole containerized system. 
In containerized environments, security scanners generally protect the OS but not the application containers, which adds unwanted vulnerability.

Container management, orchestration, clustering 
Container orchestration or container management is mostly used in the context of application containers. Implementations providing such an orchestration include Kubernetes and Docker swarm.

Container cluster management 
Container clusters need to be managed. This includes functionality to create a cluster, to upgrade the software or repair it, balance the load between existing instances, scale by starting or stopping instances to adapt to the number of users, to log activities and monitor produced logs or the application itself by querying sensors. Open-source implementations of such software include OKD and Rancher. Quite a number of companies provide container cluster management as a managed service, like Alibaba, Amazon, Google, Microsoft.

See also 

 Docker (software)
 Kubernetes
 Virtual machines

Further reading 
Journal articles
 
 
 
 
 

Books
 Gabriel N. Schenker, Hideto Saito, Hui-Chuan Chloe Lee, Ke-Jou Carol Hsu, (2019) Getting Started with Containerization: Reduce the operational burden on your system by automating and managing your containers, Packt Publishing, 
 Jeeva S. Chelladhurai, Vinod Singh, Pethuru Raj (2014), Learning Docker, Packt Publishing,

References 

Cloud computing